Neopentyllithium is an organolithium compound with the chemical formula C5H11Li. Commercially available, it is a strong, non-nucleophilic base sometimes encountered in organometallic chemistry.

Further reading
 

Organolithium compounds
Non-nucleophilic bases